Corregidora may refer to:

 Corregidora Municipality, municipality in central Mexico, named for:
 Josefa Ortiz de Domínguez (8 September 1768 – 2 March 1829), frequently referred to as La Corregidora
 Corregidora (novel), a novel by Gayl Jones
 Corregidora (Mexico City Metrobús), a BRT station in Mexico City

See also
Corregidor